Zahareşti may refer to several villages in Romania:

Zahareşti, a village in Pănătău Commune, Buzău County
Zahareşti, a village in Stroiești, Suceava Commune, Suceava County